The Norwegian Nobel Committee awards the Nobel Peace Prize annually "to the person who shall have done the most or the best work for fraternity between nations, for the abolition or reduction of standing armies and for the holding and promotion of peace congresses". As dictated by Nobel's will, the award is administered by the Norwegian Nobel Committee and awarded by a committee of five people elected by the Parliament of Norway.

Each recipient receives a medal, a diploma, and a monetary award prize (that has varied throughout the years). It is one of the five prizes established by the 1895 will of Alfred Nobel (who died in 1896), awarded for outstanding contributions in chemistry, physics, literature, peace, and physiology or medicine.

Overview
The Peace Prize is presented annually in Oslo, in the presence of the King of Norway, on 10 December, the anniversary of Nobel's death, and is the only Nobel Prize not presented in Stockholm. Unlike the other prizes, the Peace Prize is occasionally awarded to an organisation (such as the International Committee of the Red Cross, a three-time recipient) rather than an individual.

The Nobel Peace Prize was first awarded in 1901 to Frédéric Passy and Henry Dunant, who shared a Prize of 150,782 Swedish kronor (equal to 7,731,004 kronor in 2008), and most recently in 2021 to Maria Ressa and Dmitry Muratov.

 Linus Pauling, the Nobel Peace Prize laureate in 1962, is the only person to have been awarded two unshared Nobel Prizes; he won the Nobel Prize in Chemistry in 1954.
 At 17 years of age, Malala Yousafzai, the 2014 recipient, is the youngest to be awarded the Peace Prize.
 The first woman to receive a Nobel Peace Prize was Bertha von Suttner in 1905. Of the 109 individual Nobel Peace Prize Laureates, 18 have been women.
 The International Committee of the Red Cross has received the most Nobel Peace Prizes, having been awarded the Prize three times for its humanitarian work.
 Four Nobel Peace Prize Laureates were under arrest at the time of their awards: Carl von Ossietzky, Aung San Suu Kyi, Liu Xiaobo and Ales Bialiatski.

Laureates 
, the Peace Prize has been awarded to 110 individuals and 27 organizations. Eighteen women have won the Nobel Peace Prize, more than any other Nobel Prize. Only two recipients have won multiple Peace Prizes: the International Committee of the Red Cross has won three times (1917, 1944 and 1963) and the Office of the United Nations High Commissioner for Refugees has won twice (1954 and 1981). There have been 19 years in which the Peace Prize was not awarded.

See also 
 List of Nobel laureates
 List of peace activists
 List of organizations nominated for the Nobel Peace Prize
 List of individuals nominated for the Nobel Peace Prize
 PRIO Director's Shortlist

Notes 
 The following laureates were all awarded their respective Prizes one year late because the Committee decided that none of the nominations in the year in which they are listed as being awarded the Prize met the criteria in Nobel's will; per its rules the Committee delayed the awarding of the Prizes until the next year, although they were awarded as the previous year's Prize:
Elihu Root (1912), Woodrow Wilson (1919),  Austen Chamberlain (1925), Charles G. Dawes (1925), Frank B. Kellogg (1929), Norman Angell (1933), Carl von Ossietzky (1935), International Committee of the Red Cross (1944), Albert Schweitzer (1952), Office of the United Nations High Commissioner for Refugees (1954), Albert Lutuli (1960), Linus Pauling (1962)
Carl von Ossietzky's Prize was awarded in absentia because he was imprisoned and was refused a passport by the government of Germany.
Dag Hammarskjöld's Prize was awarded posthumously.
Lê Đức Thọ declined to accept the Prize.
Andrei Sakharov's Prize was awarded in absentia because he was refused a passport by the government of the Soviet Union.
Aung San Suu Kyi's Prize was awarded in absentia because she was being held prisoner by the government of Burma. Following her release from house arrest and election to the Pyithu Hluttaw, Suu Kyi accepted her award in person on 16 June 2012.
Liu Xiaobo's Prize was awarded in absentia because he was imprisoned in China.

References

Citations

Sources

External links 

 Official website of the Norwegian Nobel Committee

 

Peace